The 1927–28 Sussex County Football League season was the eighth in the history of the competition.

League table
The league featured 12 clubs, 10 which competed in the last season, along with two new clubs:
 Bognor Regis
 Haywards Heath

Allen West changed name to Bexhill.

League table

References

1927-28
9